Dimethyltubocurarinium chloride (INN; also known as metocurine chloride (USAN) and dimethyltubocurarine chloride) is a non-depolarizing nicotinic acetylcholine receptor antagonist used as a muscle relaxant.

References 

Quaternary ammonium compounds
Nicotinic antagonists
Norsalsolinol ethers
Pyrogallol ethers
Macrocycles
Cyclophanes